Semiini is a tribe of plant bugs in the family Miridae. There are more than 30 genera in Semiini.

Genera
These 33 genera belong to the tribe Semiini:

 Subtribe Exocarpocorina Schuh & Menard, 2013
 Ampimpacoris Weirauch & Schuh, 2011 - Neotropics
 Ancoraphylus Weirauch, 2007 - Australia
 Araucanophylus Carvalho, 1984 - Neotropics
 Basileobius Eyles & Schuh, 2003 - Australia
 Chiloephylus Carvalho, 1984 - Neotropics
 Cyrtodiridius Eyles & Schuh, 2003 - Australia
 Exocarpocoris Weirauch, 2007 - Australia
 Gonzalezinus Carvalho, 1981 - Neotropics
 Halormus Eyles & Schuh, 2003 - Australia
 Harpagophylus Schuh & Weirauch, 2010 - Australia
 Jiwarli Soto & Weirauch, 2007 - Australia
 Leptidolon Reuter, 1904 - Australia, New Zealand
 Mecenopa Eyles & Schuh, 2003 - Australia
 Melaleucoides Schuh & Weirauch, 2010 - Australia
 Pimeleocoris Eyles & Schuh, 2003 - Australia
 Polyozus Eyles & Schuh, 2003 - Australia
 Thryptomenomiris Schuh & Weirauch, 2010 - Australia
 Wallabicoris Schuh & Pedraza, 2010 - Australia
 Xiphoidellus Weirauch & Schuh, 2011 - Australia
 Xiphoides Eyles & Schuh, 2003 - Australia
 Subtribe Semiina Knight, 1923
 Criocoris Fieber, 1858 - Holarctic
 Hoplomachidea Reuter, 1909 - Western Nearctic
 Karoocapsus Schuh, 1974 - Africa
 Monocris V. Putshkov, 1974 - Palearctic
 Monospatha Eyles & Schuh 2003
 Myrmicopsella Poppius, 1914 - Africa
 Nicholia Knight, 1929 - Nearctic
 Parapseudosthenarus Schuh, 1974 - Africa
 Pseudosthenarus Poppius, 1914 - Africa
 Rakula Odhiambo, 1967 - Africa
 Semium Reuter, 1876 - Nearctic
 Thoth Linnavuori, 1993 - Africa
 Tytthus Fieber, 1864 - Cosmopolitan

References

Phylinae